Oaklette Historic District is a national historic district located at Chesapeake, Virginia. The district encompasses 30 contributing buildings and 1 contributing object in an early-20th century planned streetcar suburb of Norfolk, Virginia. It is a primarily residential district that developed starting about World War I. The dwellings include representative examples of the Colonial Revival and Bungalow styles. Notable buildings include the Savage House (1915-1919), Pascal Paxson House (1901), George Wesley Jones House (1925), Samuel Paxson House (1906), Colonna Estate Caretaker's House (1925), and the Baker House (1910).

It was listed on the National Register of Historic Places in 2003.

References

Historic districts on the National Register of Historic Places in Virginia
Colonial Revival architecture in Virginia
Buildings and structures in Chesapeake, Virginia
National Register of Historic Places in Chesapeake, Virginia